Melieria is a genus of picture-winged fly in the family Ulidiidae.

European species
Subgenus Hypochra Loew, 1868
M. albipennis (Loew, 1846)
M. albufera (Lyneborg, 1969)
M. parmensis Rondani, 1869
M. subapennina Rondani, 1869
Subgenus Melieria Loew, 1868
M. acuticornis (Loew, 1854)
M. cana (Loew, 1858) 
M. crassipennis (Fabricius, 1794) 
M. nana (Loew, 1873)
M. nigritarsis Becker, 1903
M. omissa (Meigen, 1826) 
M. picta (Meigen, 1826) 
M. unicolor (Loew, 1854)
Subgenus Phaeosoma Loew, 1868
M. atricornis (Mik, 1885)

World species

Melieria acuticornis (Loew, 1854)
Melieria albipennis (Loew, 1846)
Melieria albufera (Lyneborg, 1969)
Melieria atricornis (Mik, 1885)
Melieria beckeri Soós, 1971
Melieria cana (Loew, 1858)
Melieria clara Kameneva, 1996
Melieria crassipennis (Fabricius, 1794)
Melieria dolini Kameneva, 1996
Melieria felis Kameneva, 1996
Melieria gangraenosa (Panzer, 1798)
Melieria imitans Soós, 1971
Melieria immaculata Becker, 1907
Melieria kaszabi Soós, 1971
Melieria latigenis Hendel, 1934
Melieria limpidipennis Becker, 1907
Melieria mongolica Soós, 1971
Melieria nana (Loew, 1873)
Melieria nigritarsis Becker, 1903
Melieria nigritarsoides Soós, 1971
Melieria obscura (Robineau-Desvoidy, 1830)
Melieria obscuripes (Loew, 1873)
Melieria occidentalis Coquillett, 1904
Melieria occulta Becker, 1907
Melieria ochricornis (Loew, 1873)
Melieria omissa (Meigen, 1826)
Melieria oxiana Kameneva, 1996
Melieria pallipes (Robineau-Desvoidy, 1830)
Melieria parmensis Rondani, 1869
Melieria picta (Meigen, 1826)
Melieria pseudosystata Kameneva, 1996
Melieria pulicaria (Robineau-Desvoidy, 1830)
Melieria rubella (Robineau-Desvoidy, 1830)
Melieria sabuleti Steyskal, 1962
Melieria similis (Loew, 1873)
Melieria soosi Kameneva, 2000
Melieria subapennina Rondani, 1869
Melieria theodori Kameneva, 2000
Melieria turcomanica Kameneva, 1996
Melieria unicolor (Loew, 1854)

References

 
Ulidiidae
Brachycera genera
Taxa named by Jean-Baptiste Robineau-Desvoidy